The 1952 North Antrim by-election was held on 27 October 1952.  It was held due to the resignation of the incumbent Ulster Unionist MP, Sir Hugh O'Neill.  The seat was retained by his son, Phelim O'Neill, who was unopposed as the Unionist candidate.

Result

External links 
A Vision Of Britain Through Time

References

Unopposed by-elections to the Parliament of the United Kingdom in Northern Irish constituencies
By-elections to the Parliament of the United Kingdom in County Antrim constituencies
1952 elections in the United Kingdom
20th century in County Antrim
October 1952 events in the United Kingdom
1952 elections in Northern Ireland